This is a list of Independent Catholic denominations which either currently or previously existed. While these denominations identify as Catholic, none is in communion with the Holy See. Only Independent Catholic denominations that have a Wikipedia article are listed.

Denominations of Roman Catholic tradition 

Palmarian Christian Church
 Philippine Independent Church
 Apostolic Catholic Church
Apostles of Infinite Love
Traditionalist Mexican-American Catholic Church

Denominations of Old Catholic tradition

 Old Roman Catholic Church in Great Britain
 Christ Catholic Church
 Ecumenical Catholic Church 
 American Catholic Church in the United States
American Catholic Church (1915)
 American National Catholic Church
 Community Catholic Church of Canada
 Canonical Old Roman Catholic Church
 Mexican National Catholic Church
 North American Old Catholic Church
 Ecumenical Catholic Communion

Liberal Catholic churches

 Liberal Catholic Church, Province of the United States of America
 The Young Rite

See also
 Episcopi vagantes
 Liberal Catholic Church International

Independent Catholic